Maria Cielito "Pops" Lukban Fernandez (born December 12, 1966) is a Filipina singer, entertainer, entrepreneur, TV host and actress.

Dubbed as The Philippines Concert Queen in which for the last Four decades she has performed Internationally and locally in sold out shows, Arenas, and previously with ensembles before transitioning from music acting on the big screen to Hosting Successful TV shows such as Penthouse Live!, ASAP, before she became a Fashion designer. her career established her to the movie game as she separated from her marriage from her husband Martin Nievera. With a record breaking ticket sales for her concert called Shindig which also made praise through album sales and international tours in 1999-2002 and 2 Box Office Films through Viva Entertainment.

2009–present

In 2009, Fernandez performed in the US leg of her The Divas 4 Divas Tour together with Regine Velasquez, Kuh Ledesma and Zsa Zsa Padilla. She released a new album under MCA Universal entitled Hope, which is a collection of cover versions including a new version of her 1983 song "Little Star".

In 2019, she is one of the 50 panelists around the world to participate in a new American reality talent show The World's Best by CBS. While she is the first Filipina to be featured as a judge in an American reality talent show, she was not the first judge from the Philippines. Bryan Boy, who is a Filipino, was a judge for ANTM USA.                                                         
In 2020, Fernandez became the guest judge in The Clash season 3 while Misalucha did not return due to health reasons.

Discography

Albums
1982: Pops (Canary Records)
1983: Pops Fernandez in Love (Canary Records)
1984: Heading for the Top (Canary Records)
1986: The Best of Pops Fernandez (OctoArts International)
1989: Awesome (Sunshine Records)
1991: Change (Sunshine Records)
1993: Pops (Dyna Music)
1996: Colours (Star Music)
1999: Nagmamahal Pa Rin sa 'Yo (Star Music)
1999: Moments (Viva Records)
2001: Shindig Live (Viva Records)
2001: The Story of Pops Fernandez (EMI Philippines)
2002: The Way I Feel Inside (Viva Records)
2004: When Words Are Not Enough (Warner Music)
2006: Silver (Viva Records)
2006: Don't Say Goodbye (re-release) (Vicor Music Corporation)
2009: Hope (MCA Music)
2012: No More Words (collaboration with Martin Nievera) (PolyEast Records)

Compilation appearances

Filmography

Film
Love Ko 'To (1980)
Pag-ibig Pa (1982)
Just Say You Love Me (1982)
Paano Ba ang Magmahal (1984)
Give Me Five (1984)
Bilanggo...Prisons No. 10069 (1985)
Payaso (1986)
Always and Forever (1986)
Si Mister at Si Misis (1986)
Shoot That Ball (1987)
Stupid Cupid (1988)
Sa Puso Ko Hahalik Ang Mundo (1988)
Twinkle, Twinkle Magic Star (1988)
Magic to Love (1989)
Kung Maibabalik Ko Lang (1989)
Tamis ng Unang Halik (1989)
Linlang (1999)
Gusto Ko Nang Lumigaya (2000)
Videoke King (2002)
Zsazsa Zaturnnah Ze Moveeh (2006)

Television

Awards

See also
Rico J. Puno
Kuh Ledesma
George Canseco
Martin Nievera
Gary Valenciano

References

External links
Pops Fernandez World's Best Talent Recap Interview
Pops Fernandez on FHM.com.ph
Philippine Post: Pops Fernandez
Pops Fernandez at Pinoycentral.com

gmanews.tv/video, Pops Fernandez (in Filipino)

1966 births
Living people
Actresses from Metro Manila
Filipino child actresses
Filipino child singers
Filipino dance musicians
Filipino film actresses
Filipino television actresses
Filipino television personalities
Filipino women pop singers
Filipino television variety show hosts
MCA Music Inc. (Philippines) artists
People from Quezon
People from Quezon City
Singers from Metro Manila
GMA Network personalities
ABS-CBN personalities
Star Magic
Viva Artists Agency
Viva Records (Philippines) artists